East Canton is a village in Stark County in the U.S. state of Ohio. The population was 1,591 at the 2010 census. It is part of the Canton-Massillon, OH Metropolitan Statistical Area.

East Canton was originally settled under the name "Osnaburg". The village was founded with the help of Mallory Paige. There is a statue in memory of her at the Ward house.

Date Research
The Osnaburg Township Plat map of 1875, shows the village as Osnaburg. Inside this book on page 23, within the history of Osnaburg Township, it is written: "James Leeper laid out the town of Osnaburg about 1807, and settlers located near by, in the expectation of its being the county seat."
The 1910 census still shows inhabitants as Osnaburg, Osnaburg twp., Stark Co., Ohio, United States.
However the 1920 census shows inhabitants as East Canton, incorporated place; Osnaburg Township. So the village changed its name somewhere between 1910 and 1920.

Geography
East Canton is located at  (40.786708, -81.287080).

Demographics

2010 census
As of the census of 2010, there were 1,591 people, 662 households, and 448 families living in the village. The racial makeup of the village was 94.0% White, 3.3% African American, 0.1% Native American, 0.1% Asian, 0.7% from other races, and 1.8% from two or more races. Hispanic or Latino of any race were 1.7% of the population.

There were 662 households, of which 32.2% had children under the age of 18 living with them, 49.5% were married couples living together, 12.1% had a female householder with no husband present, 6.0% had a male householder with no wife present, and 32.3% were non-families. 25.8% of all households were made up of individuals, and 11.5% had someone living alone who was 65 years of age or older. The average household size was 2.40 and the average family size was 2.90.

The median age in the village was 39.8 years. 23.1% of residents were under the age of 18; 6.8% were between the ages of 18 and 24; 26.6% were from 25 to 44; 28.5% were from 45 to 64; and 15% were 65 years of age or older. The gender makeup of the village was 49.2% male and 50.8% female.

2000 census
As of the census of 2000, there were 1,629 people, 664 households, and 470 families living in the village. The population density was 155,228.7 people per square mile (47442.9/km2). There were 696 housing units at an average density of 525.0 per square mile (202.1/km2). The racial makeup of the village was 94.78% White, 3.87% Black or African American, 0.49% Native American, 0.06% Asian American, and 0.80% from two or more races. 1.10% of the population is Hispanic or Latino of any race.

There were 664 households, out of which 30.3% had children under the age of 18 living with them, 53.8% were married couples living together, 13.0% had a female householder with no husband present, and 29.1% were non-families. 24.2% of all households were made up of individuals, and 8.3% had someone living alone who was 65 years of age or older. The average household size was 2.45 and the average family size was 2.90.

In the village, the population was spread out, with 22.8% under the age of 18, 10.1% from 18 to 24, 29.7% from 25 to 44, 24.1% from 45 to 64, and 13.3% who were 65 years of age or older. The median age was 38 years. For every 100 females there were 96.5 males. For every 100 females age 18 and over, there were 92.2 males.

The median income for a household in the village was $40,756, and the median income for a family was $43,796. Males had a median income of $34,286 versus $21,458 for females. The per capita income for the village was $17,904. About 5.9% of families and 8.1% of the population were below the poverty line, including 12.6% of those under age 18 and 13.0% of those age 65 or over.

Education
Osnaburg Local School District (East Canton Schools) operates one elementary school, one middle school, and East Canton High School all out of a single building.

East Canton has a public library, a branch of Stark County District Library.

Notable people

East Canton was the home of Vince Shupe, a Major League Baseball player. The film star Jean Peters was born and went to high school there. It is also the birthplace of the sinologist Victor H. Mair. East Canton is the current hometown of independent professional wrestler Wilbur Whitlock (Jerrod Griffiths). He is popularly billed in ring introductions as "From The Mean Streets of East Canton, Ohio".

References

External links
 Village website

Villages in Stark County, Ohio
Villages in Ohio